Emma Anna Marianne Pennsäter (born 29 November 1997) is a Swedish footballer who plays as a defender for Växjö DFF. She began her professional career with FC Rosengård and was sent on loan to Brøndby IF of the Danish Elitedivisionen in July 2017.

Honours 
Rosengård
Winner
 Damallsvenskan (2): 2014, 2015
 Svenska Supercupen: 2015

Runner-up
 Svenska Cupen: 2014–15

Brøndby
Winner
 Kvindepokalen: 2017–18

Runner-up
 Elitedivisionen: 2017–18

References

External links 
 
 Profile at Swedish Football Association (SvFF) 

1997 births
Living people
Swedish women's footballers
IF Limhamn Bunkeflo players
FC Rosengård players
Damallsvenskan players
Women's association football defenders
Brøndby IF (women) players
Expatriate women's footballers in Denmark
Swedish expatriates in Denmark
BK Häcken FF players
Footballers from Malmö
Sweden women's youth international footballers